Borhan may refer to:

 Borhan, Hormozgan
 Borhan, West Azerbaijan